Andrew Whitfield may refer to:

Andrew Whitfield (politician), South African politician
Andrew Carnegie Whitfield (born 1910), nephew of wealthy steel magnate Andrew Carnegie, who mysteriously disappeared in New York in 1938
Andy Whitfield (1971–2011), Welsh actor and model